Turmeric juice (sometimes referred to as "drinkable turmeric" or "turmeric elixir") is a form of drink made from 
turmeric. The demand for turmeric juice 
has increased in the United States, with imports of turmeric tripling between 2008 and 2014. Turmeric juice has come in numerous forms throughout its history, including drops, milk, elixirs, and blended drinks.
 
Turmeric juice is claimed to have health benefits that include easing an upset stomach and reducing arthritis pain. Medical research has been carried out on purported health-giving properties of the main ingredient in turmeric juice, curcumin, though studies have not determined a precise dose, safety, or mechanism of action to require rational use of it in treatment of human diseases.

History

Turmeric

 
Turmeric grows wild in the forests of South and Southeast Asia. It is one of the key ingredients in many Asian dishes. Indian traditional medicine, called Siddha, has recommended turmeric for medicine. Its use as a coloring agent is not of primary value in South Asian cuisine. Turmeric is mostly used in savory dishes, but is used in some sweet dishes, such as the cake sfouf. In India, turmeric plant leaf is used to prepare special sweet dishes, patoleo, by layering rice flour and coconut-jaggery mixture on the leaf, and then closing and steaming it in a special copper steamer (goa). In recipes outside South Asia, turmeric is sometimes used as an agent to impart a rich, custard-like yellow color. It is used in canned beverages, baked products, dairy products, ice cream, yogurt, yellow cakes, orange juice, biscuits, popcorn color, cereals, sauces, gelatins. It is also used during the Haldi ceremony observed in Hindu wedding celebrations in India. It is a significant ingredient in most commercial curry powders.

Turmeric juice

Drinkable turmeric can be traced back to India where it has been used as a folk remedy for cough, congestion, and colds. Turmeric juice has come in numerous forms throughout its history, including drops, milk, elixirs, and blended drinks. Turmeric juice drops have been used in attempts to treat eye diseases that include pink eye, glaucoma, corneal ulcers and conjunctivitis. Turmeric tea has been traced back to the Japanese island of Okinawa, where its residents believe it helps with longevity. Golden milk is also a turmeric drink that was used in traditional Ayurveda medicine.
 
Turmeric supplement demand tripled in the United States between 2008 and 2014, with more demand being in the beverage sector. This has led companies to incorporate it into food and bottling turmeric drinks for retailers, as well as growing it locally in the U.S.  In 2015, U.S. News & World Report published a report on the turmeric trend and its use in food and for purported health purposes.

Cultivation and processing

Turmeric is grown and cultivated from various regions throughout the world including North India and South Asia, with India producing and consuming approximately 80% of the world's crop. The largest producing city in the world is Erode, a city in the South Indian state of Tamil Nadu. The United States has also become a supplier of turmeric, with Hawaii being the largest producer with organic and potent varieties of turmeric. 
 
Turmeric juice is bottled commercially through the process of cold-pressing or pascalization. Traditional turmeric juice drinks contain turmeric and additional ingredients like matcha, coconut, ginger, pineapple, spirulina, and cinnamon.

See also

 Health shake
 Juicing
 List of juices
 Smoothie

References

Vegetable juice
Alternative medicine